"The Right Hand Man" was an American television play broadcast live on March 20, 1958, as part of the second season of the CBS television series Playhouse 90. Dick Berg wrote the teleplay, as an adaptation of a story by Garson Kanin. Dana Andrews, Anne Baxter, and Leslie Nielsen starred. Franklin J. Schaffner directed. The program was the live dramatic television debut for both Andrews and Baxter.

Plot
Pat Bass (Anne Baxter) is the neglected wife of Leo Bass (Dana Andrews), the owner of a talent agency who has allowed business to dominate his life at the expense of his wife. Ralph Mohr (Leslie Nielsen) is Bass's assistant, i.e., the "right hand man". A struggle for control of the agency ensues.

Reception
Television critic Jack O'Brian called it "well-written and extremely well acted," singling out Leslie Nielsen for special praise. O'Brian also praised the physical production as "rich, big and impressively tasteful" and called Schaffner's direction "sure and effective".

Cast
The following performers received screen credit for their performances:

 Dana Andrews - Leo Bass
 Anne Baxter - Pat Bass
 Leslie Nielsen - Ralph Mohr
 Stuart Erwin - George Clay
 June Collyer - Trixie Clay
 Ruta Lee

References

1958 television plays
1958 American television episodes
Playhouse 90 (season 2) episodes